James Royce Shannon (May 13, 1881 – May 19, 1946), born James Royce, was a nationally prominent Irish-American composer and lyricist. He was active at the time of Tin Pan Alley.

Biography
He was born in Adrian, Michigan.  He is known chiefly for writing the lyrics to "The Missouri Waltz" (the state song of Missouri) and for composing the song "Too Ra Loo Ra Loo Ral" ("Irish Lullaby").

He began his musical writing career in collaboration with his mother, Eliza Shannon. His first significant composition was "Too Ra Loo Ra Loo Ral" which was one of the songs composed by Shannon for Chauncey Olcott's musical Shameen Dhu that successfully debuted in New York City in February 1914. The "Irish Lullaby" became more famous decades later when it was included in the movie Going My Way. It reached # 4 on the Billboard charts, sold over a million copies, and was included in one of Bing Crosby's albums.

Residing primarily in Detroit during his career, he owned and operated a theatrical company that toured both in the U.S. and in Europe. He was the manager for a chain of music stores in Michigan, the assistant manager for Detroit's Majestic Theatre, and served as a drama critic for the Detroit Free Press.

Selected works
Shannon, J. R. Dixie Lou. Detroit: Grinnell Bros. Music Pub, 1913. 
Shannon, J. R., and Frederic Knight Logan. Hush-a-Bye, Ma Baby: The Missouri Waltz. Chicago: Forster Music, 1916.  
Shannon, J. R., and Charles L. Johnson. I'll Be Waiting for You. Chicago: F.J.A. Forster, 1915.  
Shannon, J. R., and Fred Ziemer. There's a Red Bordered Flag in the Window. Vandersloot Music Pub. Co., 1918.  
Shannon, J. R. Too-Ra-Loo-Ra-Loo-Ral: That's an Irish Lullaby: Sung by Bing Crosby in the Paramount Picture Going My Way. New York: Witmark, 1944.  
Shannon, J. R. Where That Ragtime River Flows. Detroit: Grinnell Bros, 1912.  
Shannon, J. R., and Fred Ziemer. Yankee Boy. Williamsport, Pa: Vandersloot Music Pub. Co, 1918.

References

External links
 
 List of Works by James Royce Shannon

1881 births
1946 suicides
American male composers
American lyricists
American people of Irish descent
Musicians from Michigan
20th-century American composers
People from Adrian, Michigan
Suicides in Michigan
American theater critics
Songwriters from Michigan
20th-century American male musicians
American male songwriters